Christopher Rodgers  may refer to:
 Christopher Raymond Perry Rodgers (1819–1892), officer in the United States Navy
Chris Rodgers (born 1976), English golfer

See also
Chris Rogers (disambiguation)